The Cheshire Record Office is the county record office and diocesan record office for Cheshire.  It houses the Cheshire Archives and Local Studies Service (formerly Cheshire and Chester Archives and Local Studies Service). Since 1986 it has been based in Duke Street, Chester.

Further reading
Caroline M. Williams, Guide to the Cheshire Record Office and Chester Diocesan Record Office, Chester: Cheshire County Council, 1991
Our Cheshire Parishes: glimpses of parish government through the ages. Chester: Cheshire County Council, 1994 (published to celebrate the centenary of parish councils)

External links
Cheshire Archives and Local Studies website
E-mapping Victorian Cheshire

Archives in Cheshire
Chester
Organisations based in Cheshire
History of Cheshire
Government agencies with year of establishment missing
County record offices in England